The American Artists' Congress (AAC) was an organization founded in February 1936 as part of the popular front of the Communist Party USA as a vehicle for uniting graphic artists in projects helping to combat the spread of fascism. During World War II the organization was merged into the Artists' Council for Victory, which effectively spelled the end of the organization.

Organizational history

Origins

The Great Depression and the rise of fascism in the 1930s caused politics and arts to collide as cultural liberals united to work on common goals. Communist parties adopted a policy of forming broad alliances with anybody willing to oppose fascism and became known as the Popular Front. After the official formation of the United Front in 1935, artists in the U.S. began seeing themselves as the “guardians of liberal and democratic ideals” 

Social art became significant, with 1933–38 seeing the formation of the John Reed Clubs, the Artists Union, the Harlem Artists Guild, and the American Artists' Congress.  Artists had an idealistic view of working-class culture and used the labor movement as a sort of prototype for their mission.  There was a shift in the patronage, subject matter, and position of the art produced during this time.

By 1934 and 1935, it became clear that the John Reed Clubs' sectarian policies were not congruent with the Popular Front. At a meeting of the John Reed Club, the idea of an American Artists' Congress was discussed and twelve of those present were given the task of organizing it. Stuart Davis was put in charge of forming its committee.  Almost all of those involved with creating the AAC were established figures of the Communist left and had some connection with the John Reed Clubs.

Mission

The AAC hoped to establish a group of artists who realized that collective organization was necessary to combat fascism. Politically and artistically, the congress attempted to distinguish itself from the John Reed clubs, which were specifically radical and rigidly adhered to a particular set of views.  By creating a group that was non-sectarian and tolerant of all affiliations, the AAC fit in with the goal of the Popular Front.

In 1936, the chairman of the congress stated that “The Congress does not demand any political alignments…all we ask is that artists who realize the threat of fascism come together, discuss the situation, and form an organization of artists for their own insurance…we do not want any emphasis on extreme radicalism."

The AAC was directed towards artists who believed that the cultural crisis was a reflection of the world economic crisis.  Their specific concerns were violations of international civil liberties, the inadequacy of government programs, censorship, and the decline of traditional forms of patronage.

Early activity

The membership brochure of the AAC read: “Membership in the Congress is open to any artist of the first rank living in the U.S. without regard to the way he paints or the subject matter he chooses to deal with in his work. The only standard for membership is whether he has achieved a position of distinction in his profession and the only requirement that he support the program of the Congress against war and fascism.” 

At the first congress meeting in 1936, the slogan was “Against War and Fascism." By the next year, the AAC toned down its platform and changed the slogan to “For Peace, for Democracy, for Cultural Progress."  The congress was anti-fascism and pro-democracy, and did not take a stance in favor of proletarian revolution as the John Reed Clubs had done. As a result, the congress attracted a wide group of artists with different backgrounds, styles, and political commitments. In November 1936, the congress claimed to have 550 members with branches in Cleveland, St. Louis, New Orleans, and Los Angeles.  

Their first activity was to boycott the exhibition of paintings to be held in conjunction with the 1936 Olympic Games in Berlin. Internationally, the congress denounced Nazi repression in Germany and fascist aggression in Spain and China. They condemned censorship in the home and of artwork, and put on annual anti-fascist exhibits.

Due to the status of many of its members, the AAC was able to generate publicity and a greater impact in the art world.  It lobbied for a permanent federal art program, fought for a museum rental fee for exhibitors, and worked to get a showing of contemporary American art at the New York World's Fair.  In 1938, the Republican gains of the mid-term elections caused such federal art projects to be rendered more conservative.

The Loyalist Movement in Spain

Internationally, the suffering in Spain under fascism was of particular priority to the AAC.  They devoted a great deal of political and artistic efforts to the Loyalist cause.  The organization urged lifting the American embargo of arms to the Loyalists and revising the Neutrality Act of 1937, which prohibited such aid.  Also in 1937, they organized theme exhibitions referring to the Spanish Civil War, which raised money to send ambulances, food, and clothing supplies to the Loyalists.  These exhibitions make clear that the most prominent anti-fascist artists were concentrating on the plight in Spain.  

Along with several organizations, the AAC formed the American Artists and Writers Ambulance Corps for Spain.  In 1939, the AAC was able to bring Pablo Picasso's painting Guernica to New York to be exhibited at the Valentine Gallery to raise money for the Spanish Refugee Relief Campaign. These attempts to help the Loyalist cause created organizational motivation for antifascist artwork that depicted images in Spain.  The resulting paintings were not literal representations of the conflicting parties in Spain but images of the essence of human suffering.  The various styles of paintings reflect the diversity of the artists aesthetic tastes and techniques.

Dissolution

The AAC had a close association with the Communist party and eventually experienced fundamental dissension in beliefs.  At a meeting in 1940, to the shock of many members, the Congress endorsed the Russian invasion of Finland.  It was believed that this implicitly defended Hitler's position by assigning the responsibility for the war to England and France. In addition, according to a succession letter, the Congress loosened its policy of boycotting Fascist and Nazi exhibits. 

At this time, 17 prominent members left the Congress, writing a letter of succession detailing why.  The AAC continued to function primarily with other organizations through 1941, but dissolved soon after U.S. entrance into the war.  The Congress then participated in a meeting called the Artists' Societies for National Defense, which established the Artists' Council for Victory, an organization that combined twenty-three artists' societies.

In May 1942 the American Artists' Congress merged with the Artists Union, thus creating the Artists League of America.

People

Founders

 Stuart Davis
 Jose de Creeft
 Werner Drewes
 Todros Geller
 Eitaro Ishigaki 
 Rockwell Kent 
 Jerome Klein
 Barbara Morgan (photographer)
 Alexander Trachtenberg

Members

 Ida Abelman
 Maxine Albro
 Victor Arnautoff
 Maurice Becker
 Earl Browder
 Stuart Davis
 Adolf Dehn
 Mabel Dwight
 Dorothy Eisner
 Joseph Freeman
 Hugo Gellert
 Mike Gold
 William Gropper
 Lena Gurr
 George Albert Harris
 Mary E. Hutchinson
 John Opper
 Meyer Schapiro
 Saul Schary
 Moses Soyer
 Beulah Stevenson
 Herbert Ferber

Associates

Most of these artists were either delegates to AAC events or exhibited at AAC shows:

 Gladys Aller
 Harold Ambellan
 Milton Avery
 Luis Arenal Bastar
 Jólan Gross-Bettelheim 
 Edward Biberman
 George Biddle
 Ilya Bolotowsky
 Alexander Calder<ref name=WarholStars/
 Paul Cadmus
 José Clemente Orozco
 Philip Evergood
 Lorser Feitelson
 Adolph Gottlieb
 Helen West Heller
 Jack Kufeld
 Yasuo Kuniyoshi
 Winifred Milius Lubell 
 Claire Mahl Moore
 Lewis Mumford
 J. B. Neumann
 Isamu Noguchi
 Saul Schary
 Ben Shahn
 David Alfaro Siqueiros
 Raphael Soyer
 James Johnson Sweeney
 Rufino Tamayo
 Max Weber

Footnotes

See also

 John Reed Club
 Jerome Klein

Arts organizations based in New York City
Political advocacy groups in the United States
Communist Party USA mass organizations
Arts organizations established in 1936
1936 establishments in the United States